James R. "Dick" Parsons is a former American college baseball and college basketball coach.   He was the coach of the Kentucky Wildcats baseball team from 1970 to 1972 and was also an assistant coach for the Kentucky Wildcats men's basketball team from 1970 to 1980 under Joe B. Hall.  He attended the University of Kentucky from 1957 to 1961 where he played both baseball and basketball.

Early years
Parson was born in Yancey, Kentucky and attended Harlan High School where he ran track and played baseball, basketball and football. He attended the University of Kentucky where he was a two sport athlete.  In baseball, he 
was all-SEC in 1959 and 1961 and All-American in 1961.

Coaching career

Basketball

Baseball

Head coaching record
Below is a table of Parson's yearly records as a collegiate head baseball coach.

References

1938 births
Living people
American men's basketball players
Guards (basketball)
Kentucky Wildcats baseball coaches
Kentucky Wildcats baseball players
Kentucky Wildcats men's basketball coaches
Kentucky Wildcats men's basketball players
People from Harlan County, Kentucky